is a Japanese racewalking athlete.

He won a gold medal in 20 kilometres race walk at the 2019 Asian Race Walking Championships in Nomi, with a World Leading time of 1:17.15 (2019 season). Representing Japan at the 2019 and 2022 World Athletics Championships, he won gold medal in the 20 kilometres walk event, consecutively in 2019 and 2022.

See also
2019 IAAF World Rankings

References

External links

Japanese male racewalkers
1996 births
Living people
Asian Games silver medalists for Japan
Asian Games medalists in athletics (track and field)
Athletes (track and field) at the 2018 Asian Games
Medalists at the 2018 Asian Games
Universiade medalists in athletics (track and field)
Universiade gold medalists for Japan
Medalists at the 2017 Summer Universiade
World Athletics Championships athletes for Japan
World Athletics Championships winners
World Athletics Championships medalists
Japan Championships in Athletics winners
Kyoto University alumni
Athletes (track and field) at the 2020 Summer Olympics
Medalists at the 2020 Summer Olympics
Olympic bronze medalists in athletics (track and field)
Olympic bronze medalists for Japan
Olympic athletes of Japan
20th-century Japanese people
21st-century Japanese people